Atlantic Airlines de Honduras was an airline based in La Ceiba, Honduras, which operated domestic and regional passenger flights, mostly out of the city's Golosón International Airport, as well as Toncontín International Airport (Tegucigalpa).

History
The company was founded in 2001 by Atlantic Airlines, an airline from Nicaragua, using assets from Rollins Air. In October 2008, Atlantic Airlines de Honduras cancelled all flights and the bad safety reputation it had received following the crash of one of its Boeing 737-200 aircraft (registered YV102T) on 30 August of that year, killing the three persons on board. In 2009, the company was disestablished.

Fleet 
The Atlantic Airlines de Honduras fleet mainly consisted of up to six Boeing 737-200 aircraft, as well as twelve Let L-410 Turbolets. Additionally, at a time airliners of the types Fokker F27 Friendship, Fairchild Hiller FH-227 and Hawker Siddeley HS 748 were operated.

Destinations 

Atlantic Airlines de Honduras offered scheduled flights to the following destinations:
Belize
Belize City - Philip S. W. Goldson International Airport
Cayman Islands
Grand Cayman - Owen Roberts International Airport
Honduras
Guanaja - Guanaja Airport
La Ceiba - Golosón International Airport (base)
Puerto Lempira - Puerto Lempira Airport
Roatán - Juan Manuel Gálvez International Airport
San Pedro Sula - Ramón Villeda Morales International Airport
Tegucigalpa - Toncontín International Airport (base)
Útila - Ùtila Airport
Nicaragua
Bluefields - Bluefields Airport
Corn IslandsCorn Island Airport
Managua - Augusto C. Sandino International Airport
Puerto Cabezas - Puerto Cabezas Airport

References

Defunct airlines of Honduras
Airlines established in 2001
Airlines disestablished in 2009